Hartmut Esslinger (born 5 June 1944) is a German-American industrial designer and inventor. He is best known for founding the design consultancy frog, and his work for Apple Computers in the early 1980s.

Life and career

Esslinger was born in Beuren (Simmersfeld), in Germany's Black Forest. At age 25, Esslinger finished his studies at the Hochschule für Gestaltung Schwäbisch Gmünd in Schwäbisch Gmünd. After facing vicious criticism of a radio clock he designed while in school and the disapproval of his mother (who burned his sketchbooks), he started his own design agency in 1969, Esslinger Design, later renamed Frogdesign. For his first client, German avant-garde consumer electronics company Wega, he created the first "full plastics" color TV and HiFi series "Wega system 3000". His work for Wega won him instant international fame. In 1974, Esslinger was hired by Sony - Sony also acquired Wega shortly after - and he was instrumental in creating a global design image for Sony, especially with the Sony Trinitron and personal music products. The Sony-Wega Music System Concept 51K was acquired by the Museum of Modern Art, New York. In 1976, Esslinger also worked for Louis Vuitton.

In 1982 he entered into an exclusive $2,000,000 per year contract with Apple Computer to create a design strategy which transformed Apple from a "Silicon Valley Start-Up" into a global brand. Setting up shop in California for the first time, Esslinger and Frogdesign created the "Snow White design language" which was applied to all Apple product lines from 1984 to 1990, commencing with the Apple IIc and including the Macintosh computer. The original Apple IIc was acquired by the Whitney Museum of Art in New York and Time voted it Design of the Year. Soon after Steve Jobs' departure, Esslinger broke his own contract with Apple and followed Jobs to NeXT. Other major client engagements include Lufthansa's global design and brand strategy, SAP's corporate identity and software user interface, Microsoft Windows branding and user interface design, Siemens, NEC, Olympus, HP, Motorola and General Electric.

In December 1990 Esslinger was featured on the cover of BusinessWeek, the only living designer thus honored since Raymond Loewy in 1934. The cover included the headline "Rebel with a cause," referencing his controversial personality and desire to be seen as a "non-conformist" within the field of design, as well as the movie Rebel Without a Cause, which Esslinger has described as his first American movie and a cultural inspiration.

Esslinger is a founding Professor of the Karlsruhe University of Arts and Design, Germany, and since 2006 he is a Professor for convergent industrial design at the University of Applied Arts in Vienna, Austria. In 1996, Esslinger was awarded an honorary doctorate of Fine Arts by the Parsons School of Design, New York City. Since 2012 Esslinger has served as a DeTao Master of Industrial Design with The Beijing DeTao Masters Academy (DTMA) in Shanghai, China.

In 2009 Esslinger published A Fine Line in which he explores business solutions that are environmentally sustainable and contribute to an enduring global economy.

Notable awards and accomplishments 

 1969  Bundespreis Gute Form (Federal Design Award) - German Design Council 
 1991  Lucky Strike Design Award - Raymond Loewy Foundation
 1993  Design Team of the Year - Red Dot Design Awards 
 1996  Honorary Doctorate of Fine Arts - Parsons School of Design 
 2013  Honorary Royal Designer for Industry - Royal Society of Arts 
 2017  Lifetime Achievement Award - Cooper Hewitt National Design Awards
 2017  World Design Medal - World Design Organization

Further reading 
 Hartmut Esslinger und frogdesign. von Hartmut Esslinger und Uta Brandes, 1992 Steidl Verlag, Göttingen, 
 Frog: Form Follows Emotion (Cutting Edge S.) von Fay Sweet, 1999 Thames and Hudson Ltd., 
 Frogdesign von Hartmut Esslinger und Volker Fischer, 2000 Edition Axel Menges, 
 A Fine Line: How Design Strategies Are Shaping the Future of Business von Hartmut Esslinger, 2009 Jossey-Bass, 
 Nye, Sean. "Hartmut Esslinger." In Immigrant Entrepreneurship: German-American Business Biographies, 1720 to the Present, vol. 5, edited by R. Daniel Wadhwani. German Historical Institute. Last modified April 29, 2015. http://www.immigrantentrepreneurship.org/entry.php?rec=236
 Keep It Simple: The Early Design Years of Apple. by: Hartmut Esslinger, January 2014, Arnoldsche Verlagsanstalt

References

1. http://archive.computerhistory.org/resources/access/text/2011/10/102743122-05-01-acc.pdf

External links
 Apple IIc image
 A Fine Line: How Design Strategies Are Shaping the Future of Business by Hartmut Esslinger
 Hartmut Esslinger's Amazing Apple Mac Prototypes  via Fast Company
 Presenter at Cusp Conference 2009

1944 births
German industrial designers
Living people
People from Calw (district)
Apple Inc. employees
Design schools in Germany
Academic staff of the University of Applied Arts Vienna